This is a list of schools in Dundee City, Scotland. As of 2021 there are 11 secondary schools (eight state-run and one private), 38 primary schools (37 state-run and one private), and one state-run special educational needs school. All the listed state schools are run by Dundee City Council.

Primary schools

Secondary schools 
 
 Baldragon Academy
 Braeview Academy
 Craigie High School
 Grove Academy
 Harris Academy
 Morgan Academy
 St John's RC High School
 St Paul's RC Academy

Independent schools

 The High School of Dundee (Provides both primary and secondary education)

Special Schools

 Kingspark School

Schools in Dundee
Dundee
Schools